Johann Josef Wenzel Anton Franz Karl, Graf Radetzky von Radetz (2 November 1766 – 5 January 1858) was a Czech nobleman and Austrian field marshal. He served as chief of the general staff in the Habsburg monarchy during the later period of the Napoleonic Wars and afterwards began military reforms. A disciplined and fair man, he was so beloved by his troops that he was known as Vater ('Father') Radetzky. He is best known for the victories at the Battles of Custoza (24–25 July 1848) and Novara (23 March 1849) during the First Italian War of Independence.

Early years 

Radetzky, a titled Graf ('Count'), was born into a noble Bohemian military family of Czech origin at Chateau Třebnice near Sedlčany in Bohemia (now part of the town). Orphaned at an early age (his mother, Baroness Marie Venantia Bechinie von Lažan, died giving birth), Radetzky was educated by his grandfather, and after the latter's death, he continued at the Theresa Academy in Vienna. The academy was dissolved during his first year's residence in 1785, and Radetzky became a cadet in the Austrian Army. The following year he became an officer, and in 1787 was promoted to first lieutenant in a cuirassier regiment. He served as an adjutant to both Count von Lacy and Field Marshal von Laudon during the Austro-Turkish War of 1787–1791, and in the Austrian Netherlands from 1792 to 1795.

In 1798, he married Countess Franziska von Strassoldo-Grafenberg from Tržič, Carniola (now in Slovenia). On her mother's side, she was a descendant of the Austrian House of Auersperg, which ruled one of the hereditary Habsburg duchies in what is now Slovenia. They had five sons and three daughters, only two of whom outlived their father. Radetzky also had a longstanding romantic relationship with his Italian mistress, Giuditta Meregalli of Sesto San Giovanni. She was 40 years his junior and bore him four children, all of whom took his name and were recognized by Radetzky. Meregalli received extensive letters from him, written during his battles. He was a devout lifelong Roman Catholic.

Napoleonic wars 

In 1795 Radetzky fought on the Rhine. The following year he served with Johann Beaulieu against Napoleon in Italy, but disliked the indecisive "cordon" system of warfare which Count von Lacy had instituted and other Austrian generals imitated. His personal courage was conspicuous. At the Battle of Fleurus (1794) he led a party of cavalry through the French lines to discover the fate of Charleroi, and at Valeggio sul Mincio in 1796, with a few hussars, he rescued Beaulieu from the enemy. Promoted to major, he took part in Dagobert Wurmser's Siege of Mantua campaign, which ended in the fall of that fortress. As lieutenant-colonel and colonel he displayed bravery and skill in the battles of Trebbia and Novi (1799). At the Battle of Marengo, as colonel on the staff of Melas, he was hit by five bullets, after endeavouring on the previous evening to bring about modifications in the plan suggested by the "scientific" Anton von Zach. In 1801 Radetzky was made a Knight of the Military Order of Maria Theresa.

In 1805, on the march to Ulm, he received news of his promotion to major-general and his assignment to a command in Italy under the Archduke Charles of Austria. He thus took part in the failed campaign of Caldiero. Peace provided a short respite, which he spent in studying and teaching the art of war. In 1809 he led a brigade in V Corps during the Battle of Eckmühl. Promoted lieutenant field marshal, he commanded a division in IV Corps at the Battle of Wagram. In 1810 he was created a Commander of the Order of Maria Theresa and became Inhaber of the 5th Radetzky Hussars. From 1809 to 1812, as chief of the general staff, he was active in reorganizing the army and its tactical system, but, unable to carry out the reforms he desired owing to the opposition of the Treasury, he resigned his position. In 1813 he was Schwarzenberg's chief of staff and had considerable influence on the councils of the Allied sovereigns and generals. Langenau, the quartermaster-general of the Grand Army, found him an indispensable assistant, and he had a considerable share in planning the Leipzig campaign. He won praise for his tactical skills in the battles of Brienne and Arcis-sur-Aube. He entered Paris with the allied sovereigns in March 1814, and returned with them to the Congress of Vienna, where he appears to have acted as an intermediary between Metternich and Tsar Alexander I of Russia, when the two were not on speaking terms.

Italian campaigns 

During the succeeding years of peace he disappeared from public view. He resumed his functions as chief of staff, but his ardent ideas for reforming the army came to nothing in the face of the general war-weariness and desire to "let well enough alone." His zeal added to the number of his enemies, and in 1829, after twenty years as lieutenant field marshal, it was proposed to place him on the retired list. The emperor, unwilling to go as far as that, promoted him general of cavalry and shelved him by making him governor of a fortress. But very soon afterwards, the Restoration settlement of Europe was shaken by fresh upheavals, and Radetzky was brought back into the field of war again. He took part under Frimont in the campaign against the Papal States insurgents, and succeeded that general in the chief command of the Austrian army in Italy in 1834.

In 1836, Radetzky was promoted to full field marshal. He was then seventy, but still displayed the vigor and zeal of his youth in the training and discipline of the army he commanded. But there too he was in advance of his time, and the government not only disregarded his suggestions and warnings but also refused the military the money that would have enabled the finest army it possessed to take the field at a moment's notice. Thus the events of 1848 in Italy, which gave the old field marshal his place in history among the great commanders, found him, in the beginning, not unprepared but seriously handicapped in the struggle with Charles Albert's army, and the insurgents in Milan and elsewhere. By falling back to the Quadrilatero and there, rebuffing one opponent after another, he was able to buy time until reinforcements arrived, and thenceforward up to the final triumph at the Battle of Novara on 23 March 1849, he and his army carried all before them. He also commanded the Austrian troops who reconquered Venice after the year-long siege of the rebellious city in May 1848 – August 1849. He became a Knight of the Order of the Golden Fleece in 1848.

His well-disciplined sense of duty towards officers of higher rank had become more intense in the long years of peace, and, after keeping his army loyal midst the confusion of 1848, he made no attempt to play the part of Wallenstein or even to assume Wellington's role of 'family adviser to the nation'. While as a patriot he dreamed a little of a united Germany, he remained to the end simply the commander of one of the emperor's armies.

After his triumph in Italy, he was made Viceroy of Lombardy–Venetia from 1848 to 1857 – being the only one not of royal Habsburg blood. 

Repression in Lombardy–Venetia was severe: the Austrians could act with impunity and little denunciation from the exiled patriots in the rest of Italy, and masking their action as "repression of banditry," there was little danger of it acquiring international resonance. From 1848 Radetzky introduced public caning as a form of punishment, the death penalty for conspirators and life sentences for failing to denounce revolutionary activities. The Belfiore martyrs, Luigi Dottesio and Amatore Sciesa were among the many who were executed for political activities.

While effective in preventing rebellions, these brutal acts marked the failure of all re-pacification policies between Austria and the Italian population; 1848 had dug too deep a chasm between the Italians and the Austrian government, and – as events in 1859 showed – it was only the power of the Austrian military that maintained the rule of Austria and her client states in Italy. It was part of Radetzky's good fortune that he died one year before his whole work dissolved.

Death 

Josef Wenzel Graf Radetzky of Radetz died from pneumonia on 5 January 1858 in Milan. The Emperor wished him to be buried in the Capuchin crypt (the Imperial Crypt in Vienna); however, Radetzky had bequeathed his earthly remains, and the right to bury him, to Joseph Gottfried Pargfrieder, an army supplies merchant and land owner, who decades earlier had settled his debts.

On 19 January 1858, Radetzky was buried at the Heldenberg Memorial site (Gedenkstätte Heldenberg) in Lower Austria, an open-air pantheon with warrior statues celebrating the heroes of Austrian military history from Middle Ages to the 19th century (Heldenberg literally translates as "Hero Mountain"). Radetzky lies buried in a crypt under a monumental obelisk in the central part of the pantheon, together with Field Marshal Maximilian von Wimpffen and Pargfrieder himself.

Legacy 
In military history Radetzky is highly regarded as a brilliant field marshal, while social historians consider his ruthless role as a viceroy as the point of no return in the troubled relationship between Austria and the Italian population. Radetzky was the namesake of several Austrian and Austro-Hungarian Navy warships, including the screw frigate SMS Radetzky, which fought Italy in the Third Italian War of Independence, and the SMS Radetzky, the lead ship of the Radetzky-class of pre-dreadnought battleships.

In popular culture 
Johann Strauss I's Radetzky March was commissioned to commemorate Radetzky's victories at the Battle of Custoza.

Honours
He received the following orders and decorations:

Ancestry

Works 
 Joseph Radetzky von Radetz: Denkschriften militärisch-politischen Inhalts aus dem handschriftlichen Nachlass des k.k. österreichischen Feldmarschalls Grafen Radetzky. Stuttgart: J. G. Cotta, 1858

Correspondence 
 Joseph Radetzky von Radetz: Briefe des Feldmarschalls Radetzky an seine Tochter Friederike 1847–1857; aus dem Archiv der freiherrlichen Familie Walterskirchen hrsg. von Bernhard Duhr: Festschrift der Leo-Gesellschaft zur feierlichen Enthüllung des Radetzsky-Denkmals in Wien. Wien: J. Roller, 1892.
These are Radetzky's letters to his daughter Friederike Radetzky von Radetz, Gräfin Wenckheim, published to celebrate the unveiling of the Radetzky monument in Vienna.

Notes

References

Further reading 

 Rothenberg, Gunther E. "The Austrian Army in the Age of Metternich." Journal of Modern History 40#2 (1968): 156–165. in JSTOR
 Alan Sked: The Survival of the Habsburg Empire: Radetzky, the Imperial Army, and the Class War, 1848. London; New York: Longman, 1979, 
 Alan Sked: Radetzky: Imperial Victor and Military Genius. London; New York: I.B. Tauris, 2011, 
 Wawro, Geoffrey. "An 'army of pigs': The technical, social, and political bases of Austrian Shock Tactics, 1859–1866." The Journal of Military History 59.3 (1995): 407.
 Franz Herre: Radetzky: eine Biographie. Köln: Kiepenheuer & Witsch, c1981. 
 Bowden, Scotty & Tarbox, Charlie. Armies on the Danube 1809. Arlington, Texas: Empire Games Press, 1980.

In popular culture
 Lang, Zoë. "The Regime's ‘Musical Weapon’Transformed: The Reception of Johann Strauss Sr's Radetzky March Before and After the First World War." Journal of the Royal Musical Association 134.2 (2009): 243–269.
 Alexander Lernet-Holenia: Radetzky: Schauspiel in drei Akten. [Frankfurt am Main]: S. Fischer, 1956.
 Johann Strauss: Radetzky March (Opus 228)
 Father Radetzky, a 1929 film biopic

External links 

 

 
1766 births
1858 deaths
People from Sedlčany
People from the Kingdom of Bohemia
Bohemian nobility
Field marshals of Austria
18th-century Austrian people
18th-century Bohemian people
19th-century Austrian people
People of the Revolutions of 1848
Austrian generals
Austrian soldiers
Counts of Austria
Austrian Empire military leaders of the French Revolutionary Wars
Austrian Empire commanders of the Napoleonic Wars
Generals of the Holy Roman Empire
Czech military leaders
People of the First Italian War of Independence
Austrian military personnel of the Italian Independence Wars
Theresian Military Academy alumni

Knights of the Golden Fleece of Austria
Grand Crosses of the Order of Saint Stephen of Hungary
Grand Crosses of the Military Order of Maria Theresa
Recipients of the Order of St. George of the First Degree
Grand Crosses of the Military Order of Max Joseph
Knights Grand Cross of the Order of St Gregory the Great
Knights Grand Cross of the Order of Pope Pius IX
Knights Grand Cross of the Order of Saints Maurice and Lazarus
Grand Crosses of the Order of Saint Louis